is a Japanese actress.

Filmography

Film
 Hula Girls (2006), Sanae Kimura
 Achilles and the Tortoise (2008), Mari Kuramochi
 Haru's Journey (2010), Haru Nakai
 Hanamizuki (2010), Minami Nakamura
 Arakawa Under the Bridge (2012), Stella
 Tsukigime Otoko Tomodachi (2018)
 Giwaku to Dance (2019)
 Rolling Marbles (2019)
 My Favorite Girl (2020)
 Rock 'n' roll Strip (2020)
 Will I Be Single Forever? (2021), Ayaka
 The Confidence Man JP: Episode of the Hero (2022)
 Popran (2022)
 Everything Will Be Owlright! (2022)
 Kumo to Saru no Kazoku (2023), Kumo

Television
 Arakawa Under the Bridge (2011), Stella
 Doctor Ume (2012), Yayoi Sawada
 Laugh It Up! (2017), Toki
 Fruits Takuhaibin (2019)
 Shiroi Kyotō (2019)
 A Day-Off of Kasumi Arimura (2020), Ikuko Hoshi
 Love and Fortune (2018), Wako Taira
 Yell (2020)
 Zenkamono (2021)

Awards 
 65th Mainichi Film Awards — Sponichi Grand Prix Newcomer Award — for 
 20th Japanese Film Critics Awards — Best New Actress (Kazuko Komori Award) — for Haru's Journey

References

External links 
 Official profile at Flamme
 
 @eri_flamme on Twitter

Japanese female models

Actresses from Osaka Prefecture
1988 births
Living people
21st-century Japanese actresses
People from Suita